Associazione Sportiva Roma finished 7th in Serie A, dropping four places from the season before, even firing coach Nils Liedholm for just a few weeks. It also crashed out of the UEFA Cup against comparatively minnows Dynamo Dresden in the Last 16.

Players

Goalkeepers
  Franco Tancredi
  Angelo Peruzzi

Defenders
  Fulvio Collovati
  Emidio Oddi
  Sebastiano Nela
  Moreno Ferrario
  Lionello Manfredonia
  Manuel Gerolin
  Antonio Tempestilli

Midfielders
  Andrade
  Bruno Conti
  Fabrizio Di Mauro
  Stefano Desideri
  Giuseppe Giannini
  Roberto Policano
  Renato

Forwards
  Daniele Massaro
  Ruggiero Rizzitelli
  Rudi Völler

Competitions

Serie A

League table

Matches

Coppa Italia

First round - Group 5

Second Round - Group 3

UEFA Cup

First round

Second round

Third round

Statistics

Goalscorers
  Rudi Völler 10
  Giuseppe Giannini 6 (3)
  Daniele Massaro 5
  Roberto Policano 3

References

A.S. Roma seasons
Roma